Waucousta is an unincorporated community in the town of Osceola, in Fond du Lac County, Wisconsin, United States. A branch of the Milwaukee River runs through the community.

Images

Notes

Unincorporated communities in Wisconsin
Unincorporated communities in Fond du Lac County, Wisconsin